Andre Agassi successfully defended his title, defeating Luiz Mattar 6–4, 6–3 in the final.

Seeds

  Stefan Edberg (first round)
  MaliVai Washington (semifinals)
  Brad Gilbert (quarterfinals)
  Mark Woodforde (first round)
  Andre Agassi (champion)
  Javier Sánchez (first round)
  Aaron Krickstein (second round)
  Andrei Cherkasov (first round)

Draw

Finals

Top half

Bottom half

External links
 Singles draw

Singles